Capodrise is a comune (municipality) in the Province of Caserta in the Italian region Campania, located about  north of Naples and about  southwest of Caserta.

Capodrise borders the following municipalities: Marcianise, Portico di Caserta, Recale, San Marco Evangelista, San Nicola la Strada. It forms a single conurbation together with Marcianise and Caserta itself.

References

Cities and towns in Campania